The Machine that Changed the World may refer to:

 The Machine That Changed the World (book), book by Jim Womack, Dan Jones, and Daniel Roos, about the automobile
 The Machine That Changed the World (TV miniseries), a five-part television show on electronic digital computers